Fyrkantserien (also Fyrväpplingstävlingen and Serien Stockholm-Göteborg) was an interim Swedish football league played 1918 and 1919 as Svenska Serien was not played. It featured four teams, two from Stockholm and two from Gothenburg.

Previous winners

League champions

Defunct football competitions in Sweden